Tajabad-e Sofla or Taj Abad Sofla, also known as Tajabad-e Pain, may refer to:
 Tajabad-e Sofla, Fars
 Tajabad-e Sofla, Hamadan